Two ships operated by T & J Harrison Ltd were named Inanda.

, in service 1911–20, then sold
, in service 1925–40, and 1941–42

Ship names